Cibotium menziesii, the hāpuu ii or Hawaiian tree fern, is a species of tree fern that is endemic to the islands of Hawaii. It is named after the Scottish naturalist Archibald Menzies.  It is also known as the male tree fern, and Cibotium glaucum is deemed the female tree fern due to differences in color.

Biology
The trunk is made of stiff hard fibres surrounding a starchy pith in the centre. The green fronds have yellow midribs and are paler on the underside. Stems are covered in red or black bristles. The fronds are singularly divided but divide at the end where the spores form.

Reproduction
This species reproduces through the use of spores, which form at and are released from the end of the fronds. For domestic and commercial reproduction, spores are collected from the lower fronds of the plant, which are heated, treated with water and kept refrigerated. The side shoots off the main trunk are also viable but need to be cut close to the trunk.

Habitat
Cibotium menziesii is endemic to the windward portions of the main Hawaiian islands. They can grown on the ground or on trees as an epiphyte. Despite its origin, it is very adaptable and can withstand long cool winters; even without fronds, little heat is needed to stimulate new growth. Due to the effects of invasive species, especially feral pigs, and commercial harvesting, populations of this species are currently in decline.

Uses

Food
The starchy core of the trunk can be cooked (often stewed) and eaten; it was a staple food during times of famine. This part of the trunk is an important food source for feral pigs.

Medicine
The pith of the hāpuu ii is combined with olena (Curcuma longa) roots, pawale (Rumex giganteus), and okolehao liquor to create a 'blood purifier'.  A treatment for chest pain is prepared from hāpuu ii and amaumau (Sadleria cyatheoides) piths, kukui (Aleurites moluccana) bark, ohia ai  (Syzygium malaccense) bark, ahakea (Bobea spp.) bark, uhaloa (Waltheria indica) root bark, popolo (Solanum americanum), aukoi (Senna occidentalis), noni (Morinda citrifolia) fruit, and ko kea (Saccharum officinarum). Heated fibres from the fronds are used to cure numerous bodily ailments such as muscle pain and joint stiffness.

Other uses
The pulu (frond fibres) are used to absorb bodily fluid from corpses in preparation for traditional burials. These same fibres are also used in handcrafted pillows that are sold as souvenirs on the islands.  The trunk was hollowed out by Native Hawaiians and used as a planter for uhi (Dioscorea alata), and this practice continues.

References

External links
 Cibotium Menziesii Pictures

menziesii
Endemic flora of Hawaii
Native ferns of Hawaii
Epiphytes
Flora without expected TNC conservation status